Rise Again may refer to:

 "Rise Again" (DJ Sammy song)
 "Rise Again" (The Rankin Family song)
 "Rise Again", a song by Hush from The Open Book
 "Rise Again", a song by Dallas Holm
 Rise Again (Alabama Thunderpussy album), 1998
 Rise Again (The Dreaming album), 2015, album by American band The Dreaming
 Rise Again (The Purple Helmets album), 1989
 Rise Again, an EP by Crush 40, 2012
 Rise Again (songbook), sequel to Rise Up Singing